Slaterocoris is a genus of plant bugs in the family Miridae. There are more than 50 described species in Slaterocoris.

Species
These 52 species belong to the genus Slaterocoris:

 Slaterocoris alpinus Kelton, 1968
 Slaterocoris ambrosiae (Knight, 1938)
 Slaterocoris apache Kelton, 1968
 Slaterocoris argenteoides Schwartz, 2011
 Slaterocoris argenteus Kelton, 1968
 Slaterocoris arizonensis Knight, 1970
 Slaterocoris atratus (Uhler, 1894)
 Slaterocoris atritibialis (Knight, 1938)
 Slaterocoris basicornis Knight, 1970
 Slaterocoris bifidus Knight, 1970
 Slaterocoris breviatus (Knight, 1938)
 Slaterocoris burkei Knight, 1970
 Slaterocoris clavatus Schwartz, 2011
 Slaterocoris croceipes Knight, 1970
 Slaterocoris custeri Knight, 1970
 Slaterocoris dakotae Knight, 1970
 Slaterocoris digitatus Knight, 1970
 Slaterocoris elongatus Schwartz, 2011
 Slaterocoris flavipes Kelton, 1968
 Slaterocoris fuscicornis Knight, 1970
 Slaterocoris fuscomarginalis Knight, 1970
 Slaterocoris getzendaneri Knight, 1970
 Slaterocoris hirtus (Knight, 1938)
 Slaterocoris knowltoni Knight, 1970
 Slaterocoris longipennis Knight, 1970
 Slaterocoris maculatus Schwartz, 2011
 Slaterocoris minimus Knight, 1970
 Slaterocoris mohri (Knight, 1941)
 Slaterocoris nevadensis Knight, 1970
 Slaterocoris nicholi Knight, 1970
 Slaterocoris ovatus Knight, 1970
 Slaterocoris pallidicornis (Knight, 1938)
 Slaterocoris pallipes (Knight, 1926)
 Slaterocoris pilosus Kelton, 1968
 Slaterocoris punctatus (Distant, 1893)
 Slaterocoris rarus Knight, 1970
 Slaterocoris robustus (Uhler, 1895)
 Slaterocoris rubrofemoratus Knight, 1968
 Slaterocoris schaffneri Knight, 1970
 Slaterocoris sculleni Knight, 1970
 Slaterocoris severini Knight, 1970
 Slaterocoris sheridani Knight, 1968
 Slaterocoris simplex Kelton, 1968
 Slaterocoris solidaginis Kelton, 1968
 Slaterocoris sparsus Kelton, 1968
 Slaterocoris stygicus (Say, 1832)
 Slaterocoris subalbicans (Distant, 1893)
 Slaterocoris tanydexios Schwartz, 2011
 Slaterocoris texanus Knight, 1970
 Slaterocoris tibialis Knight, 1970
 Slaterocoris utahensis Knight, 1968
 Slaterocoris woodgatei Knight, 1970

References

Further reading

 
 
 

Miridae genera
Articles created by Qbugbot
Orthotylini